Ziyad Abdul-Hameed (born 1 July 1952) is a former Iraqi football defender who played for Iraq in the 1972 AFC Asian Cup.

Ziyad played for the national team between 1973 and 1975.

References

Iraqi footballers
Iraq international footballers
Living people
1972 AFC Asian Cup players
Association football defenders
1952 births